Michael Anthony Williams (born 21 November 1969, in Bradford) is a professional footballer, who played for a number of teams during the 1990s, but is mostly remembered for his time at Sheffield Wednesday.

External links

1969 births
Living people
English footballers
Association football forwards
Sheffield Wednesday F.C. players
Halifax Town A.F.C. players
Huddersfield Town A.F.C. players
Peterborough United F.C. players
Burnley F.C. players
Oxford United F.C. players
Premier League players
English Football League players
Worksop Town F.C. players
Maltby Main F.C. players
Footballers from Bradford